CTV News Channel (Pinyin: Zhōng shì xīnwén tái) is a digital television channel operated by China Television (CTV) in Taiwan, launched on July 1, 2004.

See also
 Media of Taiwan

Television channels and stations established in 2004
Television stations in Taiwan
24-hour television news channels in Taiwan